Karl Frei (March 8, 1917 – June 18, 2011) was a Swiss gymnast and Olympic Champion. He competed at the 1948 Summer Olympics in London where he received a gold medal in the rings discipline.

References

1917 births
2011 deaths
Swiss male artistic gymnasts
Gymnasts at the 1948 Summer Olympics
Olympic gymnasts of Switzerland
Olympic gold medalists for Switzerland
Olympic medalists in gymnastics
Medalists at the 1948 Summer Olympics
20th-century Swiss people